There are four types of elections in Finland. Each Finnish citizen at least 18 years of age has the right to vote in each of the elections, which decide the following: the president, the parliament, the MEPs, and the municipal and city councils.

Finland has a presidential election every six years, in which a President of Finland is elected in two rounds on the basis of a direct popular vote.

Parliamentary elections are held every four years with a system of proportional representation in multiple seat constituencies. Finnish parliamentary elections use the D'Hondt method. Finland has a multi-party system wherein it is uncommon for a single party to achieve a majority in eduskunta; thus most Finnish governments consist of coalitions.

European Parliament elections are held every five years. Finland has 14 seats in the European Parliament.

Municipal elections are held every four years. Municipal elections are held separately in the Municipalities of Åland at the same time as the election of the Parliament of Åland. The first aluevaalit will be held in 2022.

Presidential elections

The president is elected by popular vote for a six-year term. An election was last held January 28, 2018 (there was no second round). See 2018 Finnish presidential election.

2018 Presidential election
The incumbent president Sauli Niinistö won in the first round receiving over 60% of the votes. Green League's candidate Pekka Haavisto came second, followed by Laura Huhtasaari of the Finns Party.

Parliamentary elections

Under Finland's parliamentary system the prime minister can ask the president to dissolve parliament at any time during its 4-year term, which would result in "early" elections. However, this has not occurred in the past two decades and general elections have been held every four years on the third Sunday in March in 1991, 1995, 1999, 2003, and 2007. The 2011 parliamentary elections took place on 17 April 2011. The 2015 parliamentary elections took place on 19 April 2015.

The D'Hondt method of proportional representation, used in Finland, encourages a multitude of political parties and has resulted in many coalition-cabinets. The D'Hondt method, while easy to understand and use, tends to favor large, established political parties. For example: in 2007, there were 2,000 candidates representing 18 different parties (plus independents) running for the 200 seats, and those who were elected came from just eight parties. The Prime Minister of Finland is appointed by the president, based on the vote in the parliamentary elections. Usually the chairman of the biggest party becomes the next prime minister.

In the parliamentary elections of 16 March 2003, there were two dominating parties: the Centre Party got 55 seats and the Social Democratic Party got 53 in the 200-seat Parliament. A new cabinet was formed by the Centre Party and Social Democrats together with the Swedish People's Party.

In the parliamentary elections of 2007, the Center Party retained its lead at 51 seats, but the election was a major victory for the National Coalition, which got 50 seats, and a major loss to SDP, which got 45 seats, losing 8 seats. A new coalition cabinet, Vanhanen II, between Center, Coalition, Greens, and the Swedish People's Party was formed.

Åland's parliamentary elections

Åland is a province that accounts for 0.5% of Finland's population, a total population of 27,210. The Åland's autonomous political status under the Act on Åland Autonomy gives the Parliament of Åland legislative powers over a number of areas. Aside from these issues, the state of Finland, represented by the Provincial Governor, is sovereign and residents vote in general parliamentary elections for one representative to the Finnish parliament.

Elections in Åland are held every four years at the same time as municipal elections are held in the Municipalities of Åland. A proportional representation system encourages a multitude of political parties and has resulted in many coalition cabinets. Åland has different political parties than continental Finland.

The Premier of the Government of Åland, Lantråd, is appointed by the speaker of the Parliament, based on the vote in the parliamentary elections. Usually the chairman of the biggest party becomes the next prime minister. In the parliamentary elections on 21 October 2007 there were two dominating parties: the Liberals for Åland got 10 seats, and the Åland Centre got 8 seats, in the 30-seat Lagting. These parties then formed a new cabinet led by Viveka Eriksson.

Municipal elections

Municipalities of Finland, that include cities and other (rural) municipalities, are the basic local administrative units of the country. Most of basic services are provided by the municipality, and are bound to do so by law. Municipalities have council-manager government, where the council (valtuusto) is the highest authority. Every four years, a council is elected.

Councils name a civil servant, the city manager or municipal manager, to conduct day-to-day administration of the municipality. In addition, councils name committees (lautakunta) and a municipal executive board (kunnanhallitus). Councils meet periodically and decide on major issues. The executive board prepares the bills and is responsible for the administration, finances and supervision of the interests of the municipality. Unlike in central government, executive boards usually consist of all parties represented in the council; there is no opposition.

2017 municipal elections

Although municipal elections are local only, and local results vary, they do function as a measure of the sentiments and party strengths also nationally. In the 2017 election, National Coalition was the most-voted party, with Social Democrats second and Center the third. Proportionally, the biggest winner was the Green League, whose share of votes rose to 12.5% from 8.5% in 2012 municipal elections. The biggest losers were the Finns Party, whose share of votes dropped to 8.8% from 12.3% in 2012.

2021 municipal elections

EU elections
Finland has participated in European parliament elections since joining the European Union in 1995. The first Finnish election was held in 1996.

County elections 
Finland's first county elections were held in 2022.

Referendums
The Constitution of Finland allows only for a non-binding (consultative) referendum called on by the Parliament (Article 53 of the Constitution).

As of 2013 there have been only two referendums in Finland:
 Finnish prohibition referendum in 1931
 Finnish European Union membership referendum in 1994.
In both cases measures passed, and Parliament acted according to the results of the vote (although the referendum in Finland is non-binding).

Municipal law 30-31 § gives right to Referendum since year 1990. It had been used 56 times between 1990 and 2010. Citizens of Turku collected 15,000 names in one month for referendum against the underground car park. Politicians with in the elections unknown financing from the parking company neglected the citizens opinion. According to International Association of Public Transport UITP parking places are the among the most effective ways to promote private car use in the city. Therefore, many European cities have cancelled the expensive underground car parking after the 1990s. The EU recommended actions cover develop guidance for concrete measures for the internalisation of external costs for car traffic also in urban areas. Parking control, can only be successful if they are enforceable. In Finland the shops routinely offer free parking for customers which rises the prices of food for all customers, also for those who bicycle or walk.

There were also around 40 municipal referendums in Finland (as of 2006). Most have been about municipal mergers.

If 50 thousand Finnish citizens sign an initiative (for an act or a referendum), the Parliament has to discuss it, but the initiative is not binding, so the parliament does not have to initiate a referendum. This provision entered into force on 1 March 2013, and the first such initiative to reach Parliament was an initiative to ban fur farming, which was rejected by the Parliament. Several other initiatives reached the Parliament in 2013, including "Common Sense in Copyright" initiative, and a gay marriage initiative.

See also
 Government of Finland
 President of Finland
 List of political parties in Finland
 List of political parties in Åland
 Electoral calendar
 Electoral system

External links
 Finnish Ministry of Justice website about elections in Finland
 Adam Carr's Election Archive
 NSD: European Election Database - Finland publishes regional level election data; allows for comparisons of election results, 1991–2007
 Findicator - Voting turnout in the Parliamentary Elections since 1908

References

 
Politics of Finland